Lan Yan (original Chinese name: 蓝燕; English: Leni Lan; born 9 March 1990), also known by her stage name, Crazybarby, is a Chinese actress, pop singer, and model, based in Hong Kong.

Early life 
Lan was born in Shanghai before moving to Hong Kong at the age of 18. She designed her stage name "Crazybarby" by combining her legal given name, "Crazy", and her family-given nickname, "Barby".

She graduated from the Acting Department of the Shanghai Theatre Academy and the Hong Kong Academy for Performing Arts.

Career 
In 2005, Lan played her first starring role in the romance movie Everlasting Regret, directed by Stanley Kwan. In 2006, she starred in the Russian romance movie Potseluy babochki (Kiss of a Butterfly), which beat Pirates of the Caribbean: Dead Man's Chest at the Russian box office and became the highest grossing domestic film and second-highest grossing film of that year. She was nominated for the Russian Film Festival Rookie of the Year Award and became the first actress of Chinese descent to become famous in the Russian film industry.

In 2007, Lan was scouted by Albert Yeung, who invited her to Hong Kong and sign with JCE Movies. With the company's support, she obtained a Hong Kong identity card through the Quality Migrant Admission Scheme, and began Cantonese acting classes at the Hong Kong Academy for Performing Arts.

In 2011, Lan starred in 3D Sex and Zen: Extreme Ecstasy, which became the highest grossing Hong Kong film of the year, with a box office record of HK$41 million.

In 2012, Lan starred in the Hunan Satellite TV costume drama Heroes of Sui and Tang Dynasties 1 & 2, which topped viewership numbers. Her 2013 thriller movie Ecstasy Room Escape was nominated for the Chinese American Film Festival Golden Angel Award.

Filmography

Films

Television

References

External links
 
 
 

1990 births
21st-century Chinese actresses
21st-century Chinese women singers
Actresses from Shanghai
Chinese film actresses
Chinese people of Russian descent
Chinese television actresses
Hong Kong film actresses
Hong Kong television actresses
Living people
Singers from Shanghai